Senator Ruiz may refer to:

Israel Ruiz Jr. (born 1943), New York State Senate
Ramón Ruiz (born 1965), Senate of Puerto Rico
Teresa Ruiz (politician) (born 1974), New Jersey State Senate